The Nottingham Post (formerly the Nottingham Evening Post) is an English tabloid newspaper which serves Nottingham, Nottinghamshire and parts of Derbyshire, Leicestershire and Lincolnshire.

The Post is published Monday to Saturday each week, and was also available via online subscription until 10 March 2020. It was formerly “Campaigning Newspaper of the Year”. In the first six months of 2018 the paper had a daily circulation of 14,814, down 14% on the same period in 2017.

Occasionally the newspaper includes special features which focus on a particular aspect of life in Nottingham. An example of this was the paper’s Muslims in Nottingham series in April 2007. This consisted of a week-long series of interviews and articles in both the newspaper and on the Evening Post website. They focused on Nottingham’s Muslim community, giving its members the opportunity to express their views of life in the city.

History
The first edition of The Evening Post was printed by Thomas Forman on 1 May 1878. It sold for ½d and consisted of four pages.

In July 1963, the Posts main competitor, the Nottingham Evening News, closed and merged with the Post. Also, the city’s two morning papers, the Nottingham Guardian and the Nottingham Journal, were merged into The Guardian Journal. 
On 19 June 1973, a printing dispute began, causing a period of industrial turmoil in the company, and The Guardian Journal ceased publication on that day.
During the protracted dispute, some Post journalists launched their own newspaper, receiving moral support from Brian Clough, then manager of Nottingham Forest.
Eventually, as the only remaining newspaper was the Nottingham Evening Post, which increasingly covered the whole day’s news, it was re-named the Nottingham Post from the beginning of July 2010.

One of the Posts stalwart journalists, Emrys Bryson, wrote a revue about Nottingham life called Owd Yer Tight, which ran at Nottingham's Theatre Royal. The Posts sister paper, the Nottinghamshire Weekly Guardian, published D. H. Lawrence's first short story.

In March 1996 the Post was relaunched as a full-colour tabloid, although the Saturday edition had switched to the smaller paper size as far back as 1982.

The Post was based at offices on Forman Street in the centre of Nottingham until 1998 when the paper relocated to Castle Wharf House. It moved to Tollhouse Hill in the city centre in 2012. In October 2011 printing moved from Derby to Birmingham.

In 2012, Local World acquired the paper's owner Northcliffe Media from Daily Mail and General Trust.

Other publications
As well as the main newspaper, the Post also published a weekly sports paper on a Saturday throughout the football season, The Football Post (no longer published) which included coverage of the two local Football League clubs, Nottingham Forest and Notts County, as well as coverage of local non-league football, cricket, ice hockey and rugby union. In addition to this, the Post also previously published Forest Fever, a weekly newspaper-style magazine dedicated to Nottingham Forest Football Club. Its weekly in-depth look at events at the City Ground featured interviews with players, former players, management and supporters.

There is also a monthly Bygones paper (no longer published as a separate publication), which publishes features and stories on the history of Nottingham.

Contributors

Over the years, several Post journalists moved to Fleet Street. Among them were Robert Bolton of The Sun, Robert Stephens of the Evening Standard and John Marquis of Reuters and Thomson Newspapers, who later went on to become an author and editor of the Bahamas’ best-selling daily, The Tribune. Marquis was also voted Provincial Journalist of the Year in the 1974 National Press Awards (now British Press Awards) and was for many years London Sports Editor and Chief Boxing Correspondent of the Thomson newspaper empire, covering many Mumammad Ali fights. The late political sketchwriter Frank Johnson (The Daily Telegraph and The Spectator) was briefly a Post journalist, while the music and sports writer Richard Williams trained on the Post in the 1960s. Another Post reporter, BBC regional broadcaster John Barsby, became president of the National Union of Journalists.

Among the Posts more illustrious journalists of recent times was Duncan Hamilton, whose book about Brian Clough (Provided You Don't Kiss Me) was described by TV commentator John Motson as “one of the best football books I’ve ever read.” After 20 years on the Post, Hamilton became deputy editor of the Yorkshire Post.

Well-known regional broadcaster Colin Slater was another Post stalwart, covering Notts County for many years.

Nottingham born broadcaster, writer, humourist and film maker Steve Oliver wrote as a critic for the paper between 2011 and 2017.

In April 2013, Mike Sassi was appointed the editor. One of its longest-serving editors in recent times was Barrie Williams, who served for 14 years before becoming editor of the Western Morning News in Plymouth.

In January 2020, Natalie Fahy was appointed editor of the Nottingham Post. 

As of March 2022, the newspaper's owner, Reach PLC, closed the Post's City Gate offices, meaning that the Nottingham Post's remaining journalists all work from home and the company no longer has a newsroom base in the East Midlands.

References

Newspapers published in Nottinghamshire
Northcliffe Media
Mass media in Nottingham
Publications established in 1878
Daily newspapers published in the United Kingdom
Newspapers published by Reach plc